The Broharris Canal was a canal situated in County Londonderry, Northern Ireland, which existed briefly in the 1820s. A planned extension to Limavady was never built.

History
The Broharris canal was built in the 1820s, and ran for some  southwards from Ballymacran Point on the southern shore of Lough Foyle towards Limavady. It served both as a navigation cut for boats, and as a drainage channel. The cost of construction was £4,500, and for a short time it was used to transport heavy goods, bulky foodstuffs and raw materials. It was also used to transport large quantities of kelp and shellfish harvested from the banks of the coastline to the west of Magilligan Point, which were exposed at low tide. Both products were used to fertilise the sandy soils on the flat countryside near the foot of Benevenagh.

In 1827, the inhabitants of Limavady appealed for the building of a canal from Lough Foyle to the town. John Killaly was commissioned to produce a survey, and estimated the cost of construction at £12,000. Killaly was an engineer, working for the Directors General of Inland Navigation in Dublin. Despite optimistic estimates of the volumes of traffic likely to use the waterway, plans for a horse-drawn tramway were proposed in 1832, and the canal plan was quietly dropped.

The Broharris Canal did not last for long, but there is no positive mention of its demise. The Irish Railway Commissioners produced a report on the inland waterways in 1838, in which the canal was not mentioned, although it was briefly noted in some government reports dating to the second half of the 19th century. A Royal Commission on the waterways also failed to mention it.

See also

Canals of Ireland
Canals of the United Kingdom

Bibliography

References

External links
BBC Schools - Canals
Irelands Eye

Canals in Northern Ireland
Geography of County Londonderry
Transport in County Londonderry